Daniel Owen Jones is a Welsh professional footballer who plays as a midfielder for Forest Green Rovers.

Club career
In 2018, Jones joined the academy at Forest Green Rovers. During the 2019–20 EFL Trophy, Jones made two appearances for Forest Green, against Southampton U21 and Walsall.

International career
In July 2018, Jones was called up to the Wales under-17 squad for the Telki Cup.

Career statistics

References

2000s births
Living people
Association football midfielders
Welsh footballers
Forest Green Rovers F.C. players
Wales youth international footballers